Lee Chun-yee (born 20 March 1959) is a Taiwanese politician. A member of the Democratic Progressive Party, he served in the Legislative Yuan from 1996 to 2012 as a representative of Tainan.

Political career
Born in Tainan County, Lee represented the area as a member of the Legislative Yuan from 1996 to 2012. Affiliated with the Democratic Progressive Party's Welfare State Alliance, he has also served as the DPP caucus whip. In 2009, Lee was named the Democratic Progressive Party candidate for the Tainan County magistracy. The election was cancelled as both Tainan City and Tainan County were consolidated into the special municipality of Tainan the next year. Subsequently, Lee declared his candidacy for the mayoralty of Tainan, and was challenged by Yeh Yi-jin, Su Huan-chih, and Hsu Tain-tsair. A fifth Democratic Progressive Party candidate, William Lai, later received official party support and won the office. Lee lost to Wang Ting-yu in a contentious 2011 party primary and eventually yielded his legislative seat to Wang's replacement candidate Mark Chen. Su Tseng-chang named Lee one of three deputy secretary-generals of the Democratic Progressive Party in 2012. Lee resigned from the position in 2017 to prepare his second campaign for the Tainan mayoralty. He was one of six candidates vying for the DPP mayoral nomination won by Huang Wei-cher.

Controversy
Lee was accused of accepting bribes in 2007, charges that originally stemmed from 1998. In 2010, the Taiwan High Court sentenced Lee to seven years and six months imprisonment. Two years later, he was cleared of corruption.

References

1959 births
Living people
Tainan Members of the Legislative Yuan
Democratic Progressive Party Members of the Legislative Yuan
Members of the 3rd Legislative Yuan
Members of the 4th Legislative Yuan
Members of the 5th Legislative Yuan
Members of the 6th Legislative Yuan
Members of the 7th Legislative Yuan
Taiwanese politicians convicted of corruption
Taiwanese politicians convicted of bribery